Deni (also Dení, Dani) is an Arawan language spoken in Brazil. Deni is very similar to the other languages of the Arawan language family, but is especially similar to the Jamamadi language.

References

External links 

 Collections in the Archive of the Indigenous Languages of Latin America

Arawan languages
Languages of Brazil